Nevanlinna may refer to:

 Nyenskans, a Swedish fortress on the river Neva from 1617 to 1703, at the location of today's Saint Petersburg
 Frithiof Nevanlinna,  a Finnish mathematician
 Rolf Nevanlinna, a Finnish mathematician
Nevanlinna class, a class of mathematical functions, otherwise known as bounded type
Nevanlinna invariant, a geometrical invariant
 Nevanlinna theory, a branch of complex analysis developed by Rolf Nevanlinna
 The Nevanlinna Prize